Gordon Kinsaini (born July 26, 1981) is a Surinamese former footballer who played as a right winger for SV Leo Victor in the Hoofdklasse. He previously played for SV Robinhood, and for the Suriname national team.

Career 
Kinsaini began his career at SV Robinhood, making his debut in the 1999-2000 SVB Hoofdklasse. He remained with the club for ten years becoming one of the great figures of the club finishing as joint league top scorer together with Amaktie Maasie (of SV Leo Victor) during the 2002-03 season with 18 goals each.He is known for his pace and creating chances for teammates to score. In 2009, he was transferred to SV Leo Victor.

International career 
Kinsaini has played International football for Suriname, having made his debut in the final qualifying round of the 2001 Caribbean Cup, scoring on his debut in the 5-0 win over Aruba. He also participated in the teams' 2006 FIFA World Cup qualification campaign, making four appearances while scoring twice.

International goals

Scores and results list Suriname' goal tally first.

References

External links 
 

Living people
1981 births
Sportspeople from Paramaribo
Surinamese footballers
Suriname international footballers
S.V. Robinhood players
S.V. Leo Victor players
SVB Eerste Divisie players
Association football midfielders